Microgecko persicus, known as the Persia sand gecko or Persian dwarf gecko, is a species of lizard in the family Gekkonidae. The species is endemic to Iran, Iraq and Pakistan.  its conservation status has not been assessed on the IUCN Red List.

Taxonomy
The Persia sand gecko was first formally described in 1903 by Alexander Nikolsky as Alsophylax persicus. It has since been placed in several genera, including Cyrtodactylus, Bunopus, and Tropiocolotes.

There are three accepted subspecies:
Microgecko persicus bakhtiari Minton, Anderson, & Anderson, 1970
Microgecko persicus euphorbiacola Minton, Anderson, & Anderson, 1970
Microgecko persicus persicus (Nikolsky, 1903)

The common names refers to its distribution in Persia (now Iran).

References

persicus
Reptiles of Iran
Reptiles of Pakistan
Taxa named by Alexander Nikolsky